Zakuski (plural from Russian: закуски ; singular zakuska from закуска; Polish: zakąski, zakąska) is an assortment of  cold hors d'oeuvres, entrées and snacks in food culture of Russia and in Slavic-speaking countries. It is served as a course on its own or "intended to follow each shot of vodka or another alcoholic drink." The word literally means 'something to bite after'.  It probably originated and was influenced through the fusion of Slavic, Viking-Nordic and Oriental cultures in early Rus' regions like the Novgorod Republic.

The tradition of zakuski is linked to the Swedish and Finnish brännvinsbord which was also the ancestor of modern smörgåsbord and to meze of the Ottoman Empire and other Middle Eastern cultures. Zakuski are not served as in Scandinavia at the buffet but on the dining table. Zakuski are also a food-in-itself and often not just served as starter to a meal. Zakuski were kept in the houses of the Russian gentry for feeding casual visitors who travelled long distances and whose arrival time was often unpredictable. At banquets and parties, zakuski were often served in a separate room adjacent to the dining room or on a separate table in the dining room. The tradition eventually spread to other layers of society and remained in the Soviet times, but due to lack of space, they were served on the dinner table. Zakuski became thus the first course of a festive dinner.

Nowadays, these appetizers are commonly served at banquets, dinners, parties and receptions in countries which were formerly part of the Russian Empire including some post-Soviet states and Poland. A broad selection of zakuski constitutes a standard first course at any feast table. Usually, zakuski are already laid on the table when guests are called to the dining room.

Typical zakuski consist of cold cuts, cured fishes, mixed salads, kholodets (meat jelly), pirogs or pirozhki, various pickled vegetables such as tomatoes, beets, cucumbers, sauerkraut, pickled mushrooms, deviled eggs, hard cheeses, caviar, canapés, open sandwiches, and breads.

Gallery

See also

 List of hors d'oeuvre
 List of Russian dishes
 Anju
 Antipasto
 Cicchetti
 Meze
 Pu pu platter
 Tapas
 Zacuscă

References

Further reading
 Entertaining from Ancient Rome to the Super Bowl: An Encyclopedia. pp. 437–438.

Belarusian cuisine
Russian cuisine
Polish cuisine
Ukrainian cuisine
Soviet cuisine
Appetizers
Serving and dining
Christmas food